Ems Werk railway station is a railway station near Ems, Switzerland. It is located on the Landquart–Thusis line of the Rhaetian Railway.

Services
The following services stop at Ems Werk:

 Chur S-Bahn:
 : hourly service between Rhäzüns and Schiers.
 : hourly service between Thusis and Chur.

References

External links
 
 

Railway stations in Graubünden
Rhaetian Railway stations